Stênio Marcos da Fonseca Salazar Júnior (born 10 June 1991), or simply Stênio Júnior, is a Brazilian professional footballer who plays as a striker for Thai League club BG Pathum United.

Career
Stênio Júnior, started his professional career in Brazilian club Horizonte FC when he was 20 years old. He played for Horizonte in 2012 and then for a short period in 2013. While playing for Horizonte FC, Junior was spotted by Bulgarian club Litex Lovech (coached by Hristo Stoichkov), which soon bought him. The transfer was finalized on 20 January 2013. Later that year, on 1 July 2013, Junior was loaned to Macedonian club FK Pelister. In 2013-14 season, Junior scored 7 goals for FK Pelister (4 of them in one match).

Stênio Júnior's talent was spotted by scouts of KF Shkëndija. At first the negotiations didn't go very well, and when it was thought the negotiations were over, FK Pelister and Litex Lovech agreed on a deal. KF Shëndija paid 50 000 euro to acquire the Brazilian talent.

He made his league debut for KF Shkëndija on 2 March 2014, when Shkëndija played against Makedonija GP. Junior played in the second half of the game and with accurate passing helped KF Shkëndija score 2 more goals winning the match 3-0. He made a shot which was saved by Makedonija GP's goalkeeper. After the match, the manager, Shpëtim Duro stated that Junior played a great game in his debut and that he has a bright future in KF Shkëndija.

On 23 March 2014, Stenio scored his first goal for Shkendija in an away match against Vardar. His goal proved decisive for Shkendija as the match ended 2-1 in favor of Shkendija. His 2nd goal for Shkendija came in the next match in which KF Shkendija played FK Rabotnicki at home. He scored the first goal of the match which was followed by two other goals for Shkendija and one for Rabotnicki with a final result 3-1.

In January 2020, Stênio Júnior joined Latvian club Riga. He remained with the team until September 2020.

Career statistics
(Correct )

References

External links

1991 births
Living people
Brazilian footballers
PFC Litex Lovech players
FK Pelister players
KF Shkëndija players
Horizonte Futebol Clube players
Riga FC players
Stênio Júnior
Stênio Júnior
Stênio Júnior
Stênio Júnior
First Professional Football League (Bulgaria) players
Macedonian First Football League players
Brazilian expatriate footballers
Expatriate footballers in Bulgaria
Expatriate footballers in North Macedonia
Expatriate footballers in Latvia
Association football forwards